Nottingham Island is an uninhabited island in the Qikiqtaaluk Region of Nunavut, Canada. It is located in Hudson Strait, just north of the entrance into Hudson Bay.

History
Nottingham Island was named by the English explorer Henry Hudson in 1610. A weather station was constructed on the island in 1884. In 1927, an airfield was constructed as part of a program to monitor ice in Hudson Bay. The island became uninhabited in October 1970 as Inuit residents migrated to larger towns, primarily Cape Dorset.

Fauna
The island is known for its prominent walrus population.

Notable residents
It is the birthplace of the late Inuit artist Pitseolak Ashoona as well as photographer Peter Pitseolak.

References

External links
 Other Arctic islands, The Atlas of Canada

Islands of Baffin Island
Islands of Hudson Strait
Uninhabited islands of Qikiqtaaluk Region